Jason Scott Merrells (born 2 November 1968 in Epping, Essex) is an English actor, who is best known for his roles in Casualty, Queer as Folk, Cutting It, Waterloo Road and Emmerdale.

Early life and education 
Jason Scott Merrells was born 2 November 1968. He has an elder brother Simon Merrells (born 1965) who is also an actor. Merrells studied at the Buckhurst Hill County High School from 1980 to 1986 and later at the Chichester University, where he studied fine art.

Career 
Merrells got his first role in 1994 with an appearance in the film To Die For, in which he played a small part. However, he soon established himself as a successful television actor with his role as receptionist Matt Hawley in the medical drama Casualty.  In 1999 he portrayed Phil Delaney in the television series Queer as Folk. He continued to appear in more prominent roles for years to come including in films such as Do Not Disturb (1999). His television appearances also became more frequent, and he had a recurring appearance as Martin Leach in Clocking Off between 2000 and 2001. However it was his portrayal of stylist Gavin Ferraday in the BBC One television drama series Cutting It that brought him wide notice. This followed with appearances in television shows such as The Afternoon Play, Where the Heart Is and Murder City, and a starring role in the 2005 film The Jealous God.

Merrells announced that he had been cast in the role of headteacher Jack Rimmer in the BBC One school-based drama Waterloo Road, making Merrells one of the original stars of the show appearing in the very first episode. In 2009, Merrells appeared throughout series two of Lark Rise to Candleford as James Dowland.

From 2010 to 2014, Merrells achieved popularity through his role as shrewd businessman Declan Macey in the long-running ITV soap opera Emmerdale. In September 2014, it was announced that Merrells had decided to quit his role after four years on the soap. Declan left the following month, going into hiding after killing his half-nephew Robbie Lawson (Jamie Shelton) and attempting to murder his most recent wife, Charity Macey (Emma Atkins), whom he married earlier in the year. In 2015, Merrells appeared as Stuart Howe in the BBC TV series Death in Paradise episode 4.7. From 2016 onwards, Merrells has portrayed Sir Charles Fraith in  Agatha Raisin.

In January 2023, Merrells appeared as DC Stead in the third series of BBC drama Happy Valley for three episodes.

Theatre 
From August to October 2007, Merrells performed with the Royal Shakespeare Company at the Courtyard Theatre in Stratford-upon-Avon. He played the role of Orsino in William Shakespeare's Twelfth Night, or What You Will alongside his brother Simon Merrells who played Antonio. The Merrells brothers then went on to tour in A Comedy of Errors with the Royal Shakespeare Company from October to December 2007. From March to April 2009 he appeared in the Theatre Royal Plymouth and Thelma Hunt production of Measure for Measure as Angelo alongside Alistair McGowan as the Duke. The production transferred to the Almeida Theatre in February 2010. From May to June 2015, he starred as Juror number 8 in Bill Kenwright's touring production of Twelve Angry Men, alongside Andrew Lancel, Gareth David-Lloyd, Denis Lill and Drop the Dead Donkey's Robert Duncan.

In March 2023, Merrells is to star as Frank Galvin in a theatrical adaptation of Barry Reed's 1980 novel The Verdict.

Personal life 
Jason lives part-time in London and spends the rest of his time in the North East of England. He has five children from three relationships.

Filmography

Awards and nominations

References

External links 
 
 ARG talent Agency

1968 births
Living people
English male soap opera actors
Alumni of the University of Chichester
People educated at Buckhurst Hill County High School
Male actors from Essex
People from Epping
20th-century English male actors
21st-century English male actors